The Limerick Premier Intermediate Hurling Championship (known for sponsorship reasons as the Lyons of Limerick County Premier Intermediate Hurling Championship and abbreviated to the Limerick PIHC) is an annual hurling competition organised by the Limerick County Board of the Gaelic Athletic Association and contested by the top-ranking intermediate clubs in the county of Limerick in Ireland. It is the second tier overall in the entire Limerick hurling championship system.

The Limerick Premier Intermediate Championship was introduced in 2014 following a split in the existing Limerick Intermediate Hurling Championship. It was the fourth adult county championship to come into existence in Limerick.

In its present format, the Limerick Premier Intermediate Championship uses a round-robin format with each team playing 7 matches (playing all 7 other teams once). Most games are played on Saturdays and Sundays. The two top-ranking teams proceed to the final match at the LIT Gaelic Grounds. The winner of the Limerick Premier Intermediate Championship, as well as gaining automatic promotion to the Limerick Senior Championship, qualifies for the subsequent Munster Club Championship. In 2020, the intended format was disrupted and slightly amended due to the impact of the COVID-19 pandemic.

The competition has been won by 8 teams, none of which have won the tournament more than once. Mungret/St. Paul's are the reigning champions, having beaten Cappamore by 4-17 to 1-12 in the 2021 final.

History

The Limerick Intermediate Championship was founded in 1910 in an effort to bridge the standard of play between the Limerick Senior Championship and the Limerick Junior Championship. Three separate hurling championships proved difficult to sustain, particularly due to a lack of competitive clubs, and the championship was discontinued and reinstated on a number of occasions before being reinstated permanently in 1988.

At a Special Convention of the Limerick County Board in February 2013 it was decided by 115 votes to 108 to introduce radical new changes for the 2014 championship season. While the structure of the 2013 senior and intermediate hurling championships remained unchanged, the final placings were used to ‘grade’ clubs for the new structures the following season. The changes meant that the 2014 Senior Championship was reduced from 16 to 12 teams, with the four relegated teams forming half of the new eight-team Premier Intermediate Championship for 2014. The remaining four teams for this new tier of championship were the four semi-finalists from the 2013 Intermediate Championship.

The eight teams in the inaugural championship were: Blackrock, Bruff, Bruree, Croom, Dromin-Athlacca, Garryspillane, Hospital-Herbertstown and Knockaderry. The very first match took place on 18 April 2014, with Bruff claiming a 2-19 to 2-13 victory over Bruree in the first round of group games. Bruff went on to win the very first championship after a 2-14 to 0-16 defeat of Croom in the 2014 final.

Participating teams (2018)

List of finals

Notes:
 2019 - The first match ended in a draw: Blackrock 0-18, Kildimo-Pallaskenry 0-18.

See also

 Limerick Senior Hurling Championship
 Limerick Intermediate Hurling Championship

External links
 2014 Limerick Premier Intermediate Hurling Championship

References

Hurling competitions in County Limerick
Intermediate hurling county championships